Masally District is one of the 66 districts of Azerbaijan. It is located in the south-east of the country and belongs to the Lankaran-Astara Economic Region. The district borders the districts of Lankaran, Lerik, Yardimli, Jalilabad, and Neftchala. Its capital and largest city is Masally. As of 2020, the district had a population of 227,700.

Geography 

In the east, the district is washed by the Caspian Sea, and in the west it approaches Talysh Mountains, Burovar ridge. Height of the territory reaches . There are mineral and geothermal springs in Masally. Vilash is the largest river of the district. There are broad-leaved forests of Girkan type-chestnut-leaved oak, hornbeam, beech, Persian ironwood tree, Girkan boxwood, Caucasian persimmon, medlar and others in the mountainous part of the district. Total area of the district's forests equals . There are 107 villages in Masally.

History 
Masally district was established in 1930. Formerly, the territory of the district was part of Arkevan area of Lankaran District. Before that, the territory of the district belonged to ancient Manna and Atropatena states. It was included in Talysh Khanate in the middle of the 18th century.

Politics 
The head of Masally District is chief executive. Chief executives:
 Safarov Azer Fattah oghlu-till September 30, 2004
 Aliyev Ogtay Jalil oghlu-from September 30, 2004, to September 29, 2006
 Aghayev Gazanfar Arif oghlu-since September 30, 2006
 Huseynov Rafil İsrafil oghlu-since April 14, 2012

Administrative structure 
The center of the district is the city of Masally. The average population density is 159 people per km2. Boradigah township, Badalan, Arkevan, Banbashi, Gizilagaj, Teze Alvadi, and Chakhirli villages are the other largest population aggregates.

Population 
According to data of 2020, population of the rayon consists of 228,977 people; 92% are Azerbaijanis and 7,9% are the Talysh people.

Territory 
The total area of the district is 72097 ha. 22783 ha (31,6%) of the territory belongs to the state.  (73.1%) of this area is covered with forests, which Forest Agriculture department owns 15960 ha, and the rest  is for the domestic economy.  (1.9%) area is included to water fund and  (20.02%) area belongs to the state reserve fund.

Municipality owns  (26.0%) of the area.  of this territory is for the perspective development of municipality bodies and 1393 ha of area belongs to the reserve fund of the municipality.

 (42.4%) of the area is private property.

Economy 
2,0 million manats were granted to the executive of Masally District for the acceleration of the socio-economic development in the region by the decree of the President dated 15 March 2012.

Agriculture, construction, industry, transportation, and telecommunication are the cores of economy in Masally district.

Agriculture

Construction

Industry 
In January–December 2015, there was 37366 thousand manats worth of goods and service production in the Masally industry. It is more 4,6 % more than the previous year. 85,1 percent of the total industrial production was goods and 14,9 percent was serviced.

Transportation 
In 2015, cargo transportation by automobiles was 2368 thousand ton. It is 113 thousand ton more than the previous year. Transportation of passengers was 13324 thousand persons, which is 813 thousand people more than the previous years. The total worth of transportation was 10832,4 thousand manats in 2015.

Telecommunication 
In 2015, the total worth of telecommunication services was 1375 thousand manats. It is 5.4% more than the previous year.

Museums

Museum of History and Local Lore  
The construction of the museum stated in 2014 and completed in 2016. The president Ilham Aliyev attended the opening of the museum. The museum has an exhibition hall, administrative room, ideological center, fund, and drawing gallery.

Museum of History and Regional Studies 
The museum has more than 7000 exhibits, which illustrates the history of Masally from Eneolithic period to the 20th century. Exhibits include sculptures, carvings, drawings, clothing, photos, arts, crafts, and documents.

Gallery

References 

 
Districts of Azerbaijan